Natalia Konstantinovna Vikhlyantseva (Russian: Наталья Константиновна Вихлянцева; born 16 February 1997) is a Russian tennis player. Her favourite court surface is grass.

Vikhlyantseva has career-high rankings of 54 in singles, achieved on 23 October 2017, and 216 in doubles, reached in July 2019.

Tennis career

2015–16
Vikhlyantseva made her WTA Tour main-draw debut at the 2015 Shenzhen Open where she received a wildcard. In her first WTA match, she defeated Anna-Lena Friedsam, in three sets. She lost in the second round against Simona Halep, in straight sets.

After winning two titles in 2016 on the ITF Circuit, she reached the semifinals of the Open de Limoges where she took top-seeded top-30 player Caroline Garcia to three sets.

2017: Top 100 debut and first WTA final
Vikhlyantseva debuted at a Grand Slam tournament at the 2017 Australian Open where she reached the second round of the main draw, losing to Anastasia Pavlyuchenkova. Her next tournament was the St. Petersburg Trophy for which she received a wildcard and beat Yaroslava Shvedova before upsetting No. 8 seed Daria Kasatkina in straight sets and receiving a walkover from top seed Simona Halep (who withdrew due to injury) in the quarterfinals. She lost in the semifinals to eventual champion Kristina Mladenovic. Despite her defeat, Vikhlyantseva ensured a top-100 debut with her campaign.

She reached her first WTA-level final at the Rosmalen Open, beating Cornelia Lister, former world No. 9 Andrea Petkovic, Arantxa Rus and fifth seed Ana Konjuh en route. She then lost to Anett Kontaveit, who won her first title.

After some poor results which followed, Vikhlyantseva reached the second round at the Stanford Classic and at the Linz Open before coming up with a surprise run to the semifinals of the Kremlin Cup, where she had her first ever top-20 win over compatriot Elena Vesnina in straight sets. It was Vikhlyantseva's second Premier semifinal of the year, and both of them came in Russia, her home country. However, her run was halted by Julia Görges in the semifinals, with a wrist injury hindering her from further success.

Performance timelines

Only main-draw results in WTA Tour, Grand Slam tournaments, Fed Cup/Billie Jean King Cup and Olympic Games are included in win–loss records.

Singles
Current through the 2022 Prague Open.

Doubles

WTA career finals

Singles: 1 (runner-up)

WTA 125 tournament finals

Doubles: 1 (title)

ITF Circuit finals

Singles: 6 (2 titles, 4 runner–ups)

Doubles: 2 (1 title, 1 runner–up)

Fed Cup/Billie Jean King Cup participation
This table is current through the 2019 Fed Cup

Singles (5–1)

Notes

References

External links
 
 
 

1997 births
Living people
Russian female tennis players
Sportspeople from Volgograd
21st-century Russian women
20th-century Russian women